Najeeban (also spelled Najib Yan) is a village in Panjwayi District, Kandahar Province, Afghanistan.

Kandahar massacre 

In Najeeban, a disguised American army staff sergeant walked inside the village and killed eleven members of the same family and one man in another house nearby as part of the Kandahar massacre. The twelve bodies were partially burned.

See also
Kandahar Province

References

Populated places in Kandahar Province
Panjwayi District